Elections were held in Central Visayas for seats in the House of Representatives of the Philippines on May 9, 2016.

Summary

Bohol
Each of Bohol's three legislative districts will elect each representative to the House of Representatives. The candidate with the highest number of votes wins the seat.

1st District
Rene Relampagos is the incumbent.

2nd District
Erico Aristotle Aumentado is the incumbent. Veteran provincial board member Gerardo Garcia challenged him for the seat.

3rd District
Arthur Yap is the incumbent. He is vying for his third and last term as congressman. Former Carmen mayor Conchita Toribio-delos Reyes challenged him for the seat. This is also the first time that Yap is running with an opponent.

Cebu
Each of Cebu's Six and 3 others legislative districts will elect each representative to the House of Representatives. The candidate with the highest number of votes wins the seat.

1st District
Samsam Gullas is the incumbent.

2nd District
Wilfredo Caminero is the incumbent.

3rd District
Gwendolyn Garcia is the incumbent.

4th District
Benhur Salimbangon is the incumbent

5th District
Joseph Ace Durano is not running, his brother Ramon Durano VI is the party's nominee.

6th District
Gabriel Luis Quisumbing is the incumbent but he is running for Mayor of Mandaue City, incumbent mayor Jonas Cortes is the party's nominee.

7th District
Pablo John Garcia will run for the newly created 7th District against Board Member Peter John Calderon. His sister Gwendolyn Garcia, is also running for a seat in the House of Representatives  respectively.

Cebu City
Each of Cebu City's 2 legislative districts will elect each representative to the House of Representatives. The candidate with the highest number of votes wins the seat.

1st District
Raul del Mar is the incumbent.

2nd District
Rodrigo Abellanosa is the incumbent.

Lapu-Lapu City
Aileen Radaza is the incumbent.

Siquijor
Marie Anne Pernes (LP) is the incumbent.

References

External links
Official COMELEC results 2016
COMELEC - Official website of the Philippine Commission on Elections (COMELEC)
NAMFREL - Official website of National Movement for Free Elections (NAMFREL)
PPCRV - Official website of the Parish Pastoral Council for Responsible Voting (PPCRV)

2016 Philippine general election
Lower house elections in Central Visayas